The Challenge Tour Championship was a golf tournament on the Challenge Tour that was first played in 1992 as the East Sussex National Challenge. After a break of two years, it returned as the Coca-Cola Open, before being retitled as the Challenge Tour Championship in 1996.

Winners

References

External links
Coverage on the Challenge Tour's official site

Former Challenge Tour events
Golf tournaments in England